VA250 may refer to:

 Ariane flight VA250, an Ariane 5 launch that occurred on 26 November 2019
 Virginia State Route 250 (disambiguation) (US 250 or VA-250), a highway in the United States
 RotorSchmiede VA250, an ultralight helicopter